Mengen District is a district of the Bolu Province of Turkey. Its seat is the town of Mengen. Its area is 874 km2, and its population is 13,679 (2021).

Composition
There are two municipalities in Mengen District:
 Gökçesu
 Mengen

There are 56 villages in Mengen District:

 Afşar
 Ağacalar
 Ağalar
 Akçakoca
 Akören
 Aktepe
 Alibeyler
 Arak
 Babahızır
 Banaz
 Başyellice
 Bölükören
 Bürnük
 Çayköy
 Çırdak
 Çorakkadirler
 Çorakmıtırlar
 Çubukköy
 Çukurca
 Demirciler
 Dereköy
 Düzağaç
 Düzköy
 Elemen
 Emirler
 Gözecik
 Güneygökçesu
 Hacıahmetler
 Hayranlar
 İlyaslar
 Kadılar
 Kadısusuz
 Karacalar
 Karaishak
 Karakaya
 Karaşeyhler
 Kavacık
 Kayabaşı
 Kayabükü
 Kayışlar
 Kıyaslar
 Konak
 Köprübaşı
 Küçükkuz
 Kuzgöl
 Mamatlar
 Nazırlar
 Pazarköy
 Rüknettin
 Şahbazlar
 Sarıkadılar
 Sazlar
 Teberikler
 Turna
 Yellicedemirciler
 Yumrutaş

References

Districts of Bolu Province